Neck-through-body (commonly neck-thru or neck-through) is a method of electric guitar construction that combines the instrument's
neck and core of its body into a single unit.  This may be made of a solid piece of wood, or two or more laminated together. The strings, fretboard, pickups and bridge are all mounted on it, with additional body side components (if any) filling out its full shape glued or mechanically attached.  The technique is also used on electric  bass guitars.

Neck-through-body construction is considerably more expensive than the traditional glued set-in neck and least costly bolt-on neck, but less than the rare and difficult "one-piece" fabrication out of a single piece of material.

History 
The first electric bass guitar, the solid-body "Audiovox 736" created by Paul Tutmarc circa 1937, had a neck-through construction.

"The Log", a prototype solid-body guitar built by Les Paul in 1941, can be considered as a forerunner of neck-through designed instrument.  Les Paul built the model using a recycled 4x4 fence post as the neck and body core, and mounted the disassembled parts of an Epiphone and Gibson archtop guitar onto it.  

The 1952-57 Harmony H44 had this construction feature.

In 1956 Rickenbacker was one of the first guitar manufacturers to use the modern variant of this technique, although this was originally restricted exclusively to semi-hollowbody guitars.

Pros and cons 
Neck-through construction is significantly harder to mass-produce than bolt-on or set-in neck constructions and is primarily found on high-end guitars. It is somewhat more common in basses than in guitars. Neck-through construction allows easier access to higher frets, because there is no need for a heel — the thickened area of the neck where it attached to the body. Many musicians   assert that neck-through construction provides greater sustain and allows the instrument to stay in tune longer.

Repairs to the neck are usually expensive and tedious.  In many cases, it is usually easier to remove the old neck completely, either by taking the wings off and putting an entirely new core in, or by converting the guitar to a bolt-on or set neck by creating a heel and affixing the new neck to the core already in place, rather than to try to repair the neck itself. However, thanks to excellent stability and reaction to string tension and pressure, neck-through guitars are often much more sturdy than many other guitars on the market.

Use 
This structure is used by many companies, including Parker Guitars, BC Rich, Yamaha, Cort Guitars, Ibanez (primarily on basses), Jackson, Alembic, Schecter, Carvin, ESP Guitars, and Rickenbacker.

Many configurations of the Gibson Firebird and Thunderbird are also built neck-through.

The construction method is also popular with independent guitar builders, who can typically devote more time to such a labor-intensive neck joint than a mass-producing company could.

References 

Guitar neck joints